Igodomigodo is the original name of the Benin Empire used by its own inhabitants (nowadays known as the Edo people of Nigeria).

According to Edo oral history, Igodomigodo was the name given to the kingdom by Igodo, the first ogiso (King), who founded the first dynasty of what would later be known as the Benin Empire (which existed from around 1180 until 1897 in the area of the present-day Federal Republic of Nigeria (and not in the area of the unrelated, current Republic of Benin)).

The ogiso era was replaced by the oba era, and the name of the kingdom was changed from Igodomigodo to Edo by Oba Eweka I).

Replacing the era of the ogiso, the oba dynasty was founded by Eweka I, the first Oba (and child of Oranmiyan). Eweka I renamed his empire Edo, and since then its people have been called Edo people (or ovbi-ẹdo, "child[ren] of Edo"). 

The current Oba, Ewuare II, is the 40th Oba and 89th ruler of the dynasty started by Igodo of Igodomigodo.

See also
 List of the Ogiso
 Benin Empire

References

 http://www.dawodu.net/igodo.htm

Edo history